"Guns for Hands" is a song written and recorded by American musical duo Twenty One Pilots, released as a single only in Japan. The song was originally recorded for their second self-released album, Regional at Best. It was re-recorded for their third album Vessel, their 2012 Three Songs EP, and their 2013 EP, Migraine. The video was directed by Mark C. Eshleman. The song was heavily promoted in Japan as part of the duo's concert tour through the country and experienced moderate success there, reaching number 21 on their Hot 100 chart.

Background 
In an interview with Rock Sound, Tyler Joseph explained that "Guns for Hands" came about following a meeting after a show with young fans of the band who discussed "what it was they were going through and a lot of what they were going through had to do with suicide", and added that "thank goodness it had a lot to do with them overcoming it and using music and songs, in particular his songs, to help them get over that." Joseph was consequently inspired to write a track "about taking that negative energy and aiming it at something else, not aiming it at yourself."

Music video 
The music video for "Guns for Hands" is shot in a large and empty white room, save for the performers and their instruments. The beginning of the video also shows the song's title in Japanese, as well as some subtitles. Joseph wears a blue shirt, and Dun wears a red shirt, representing the band's early logo. The video opens with Joseph putting on a ski mask and then offering another mask to a withdrawn Dun, whispering "They won't know it's you." The two launch into an energetic performance, with Joseph regularly bringing attention to the fact that his microphone is not actually recording his voice by swinging it around and rubbing it against his forehead. Prior to the rap verse, both performers wrap colored duct tape around their faces, creating makeshift masks that they remove prior to the final chorus.

Track listing

Personnel 

 Tyler Joseph – vocals, piano, bass guitar, guitar, synthesizers, keyboards, programming
 Josh Dun – drums, percussion, backing vocals

Charts

Certifications

References

2012 singles
2011 songs
Twenty One Pilots songs
Electropop songs
Reggae fusion songs
Reggae songs
Hip hop songs
Fueled by Ramen singles
Songs written by Tyler Joseph
Song recordings produced by Greg Wells
Songs about suicide